Yelantsy is a rural locality (a selo) and the administrative center of Olkhonsky District of Irkutsk Oblast, Russia. Population:

References

Notes

Sources

Rural localities in Irkutsk Oblast